Small Bridge is the oldest bridge in Zrenjanin, Serbia.

Today's steel bridge was built in 1904, on the site of an older movable wooden bridge, when it was named Franz Josef Bridge (German: ,), and after 1919 it took the name Karadžić's Bridge. 

The length of the Bridge is 31 meters, width 9 meters and height 5.5 meters. It is decorated with a regular arch construction in the form of a section of a circle.

References 

Buildings and structures in Vojvodina
Road bridges in Serbia